The Karakoram-West Tibetan Plateau alpine steppe is a montane grasslands and shrublands ecoregion found in parts of Pakistan, China, Afghanistan, and India.

Setting
The Karakoram-West Tibetan Plateau alpine steppe is an area of high-elevation grasslands covering . It is centered on the Karakoram Range, west of the Himalaya Range. It also includes nearby ranges, such as the Ladakh Range.

Climate

Flora

Most of this ecoregion consists of grasslands and herbaceous plants. Protected slopes and ravines contains Salix denticulata, Mertensia tibetica, Potentilla desertorum, Juniperus polycarpus, Polygonum viviparum, Berberis pachyacantha, Rosa webbiana, and Spiraea lycoides.

Shrublands and woodlands are found in valley bottoms. These include Hippophae rhamnoides, Myricaria elegans, Salix viminalis, Capparis spinosa, Tribulus terrestris, Pegamum harmala, Sophora alopecuroides, and Lycium ruthenicum. A few remnant steppe forests of Juniperus seravschanica and Juniperus indica are still found here.

Fauna
Sheep in this ecoregion include the Marco Polo sheep, Tibetan argali, and  urial. Goats include the markhor and ibex. 

The sheep and goats, as well as smaller mammals, make this ecoregion excellent habitat for the snow leopard.

Both the brown bear and Himalayan black bear are found here. 

Bird species richness is low. Common birds include Guldenstadt's redstart, Himalayan monal, rosefinches, raptors, and vultures.

Conservation
Much of the montane habitat in this ecoregion lies in protected areas. These include
Hemis National Park
Khunjerab National Park
Deosai National Park

See also
List of ecoregions in India

References

External links
 

Ecoregions of Afghanistan
Ecoregions of China
Ecoregions of India
Ecoregions of Pakistan
Ecoregions of the Himalayas
 
Montane grasslands and shrublands
Palearctic ecoregions